Ogasawarana optima is a species of land snail with an operculum, a terrestrial gastropod mollusk in the family Helicinidae, the helicinids.

Distribution
This species is endemic to Japan.

References

External links
 ZipcodeZoo info

Molluscs of Japan
Helicinidae
Gastropods described in 1905
Taxonomy articles created by Polbot